Wales Minor Counties Cricket Club was established in 1988, with it joining the Minor Counties Championship in the same year as a replacement for the Somerset Second XI who had withdrawn from the Minor Counties Championship at the end of the previous season. The club has played minor counties cricket since, and played List A cricket from 1993 to 2005, using a different number of home grounds during that time. Their first home minor counties fixture in 1988 was against Shropshire at the Maes-y-Dre Recreation Ground, Welshpool, while their first home List A match came six years later against Middlesex in the 1994 NatWest Trophy at Smithy Lane, Northop Hall.

The 23 grounds that Wales Minor Counties Cricket Club have used for home matches since 1988 are listed below, with statistics complete through to the end of the 2014 season.

Grounds

Map

List A
Below is a complete list of grounds used by Wales Minor Counties Cricket Club when it was permitted to play List A matches. These grounds have also held Minor Counties Championship and MCCA Knockout Trophy matches.

Minor Counties
Below is a complete list of grounds used by Wales Minor Counties Cricket Club in Minor Counties Championship and MCCA Knockout Trophy matches.

Notes

References

Wales Minor Counties Cricket Club
Cricket grounds in Wales
Wales Minor Counties